Richard Lynch Cotton (14 August 17948 December 1880) was a British vicar and academic administrator at the University of Oxford.

Cotton was born in Whitchurch, Oxfordshire, the son of Henry Calveley Cotton and Matilda Lockwood, one of 11 children (eight sons and three daughters).
He was educated at Charterhouse School and Worcester College, Oxford, where he attained a BA degree in 1815. He was a Fellow of the College from 1816 to 1838 and Provost from 1839 to 1880. He was awarded a Doctor of Divinity in 1839.
While Provost at Worcester, Cotton also became Vice-Chancellor of Oxford University in 1852.

Cotton was Vicar of Denchworth, north of Wantage in Berkshire, from 1823 to 1838. He published his lectures and sermons. On 25 June 1839, he married Charlotte Bouverie Pusey, daughter of Hon. Philip Pusey and Lady Lucy Sherard (daughter of Robert Sherard, 4th Earl of Harborough).
She lived at 38 St Giles' in Oxford, now part of St Benet's Hall, after Cotton's death during 1881–82.

See also
 Sir Sydney John Cotton (1792–1874), elder brother
 Sir Arthur Thomas Cotton (1803–1899), younger brother

References

Further reading
  Nockles, Peter B., ‘Cotton, Richard Lynch (1794–1880)’, rev. M. C. Curthoys,Oxford Dictionary of National Biography, 2004.
  Burgon, John William, ‘Richard Lynch Cotton’. In  Lives of Twelve Good Men, 1891. Archive.org.

1794 births
1880 deaths
People from Oxfordshire
People educated at Charterhouse School
Alumni of Worcester College, Oxford
Fellows of Worcester College, Oxford
Provosts of Worcester College, Oxford
19th-century English Anglican priests
Vice-Chancellors of the University of Oxford
Richard Lynch